Amma Cheppindi is a 2006 Telugu-language drama film written and direction by Gangaraju Gunnam. Sharwanand, Shriya Reddy and Suhasini play the lead roles while Suman, Nagendra Babu, and Pavan Malhotra play supporting roles. M. M. Keeravani provided the music and background score for the film, cinematography was by Gangaraju 's son Sandeep and, editing by Mohan Rama Rao. The film Producer Gangaraju Gunnam won Nandi Special Jury Award.

Plot
His father is India's foremost rocket scientist and the director of Bharat Rocket Centre. His younger brother is a class 12 topper in the country. But he himself has managed to fail class 3 for the umpteenth time. He is Bose, and he is all of 21. Bose is a happy child trapped in a man's body. He is his mother's pet and the township's bête noire. Everyone in Bharat Rocket Centre either despises him or takes advantage of him, yet he plays insouciantly with his friends from third standard. When he is removed from school Bose's mother wangles him a job in the Rocket Centre canteen to keep him occupied. Bharat Rocket Centre plans to celebrate the coming Independence Day in style as they are starting a Space Tech School with the brightest students in the country and with the top scientists as guest lecturers. ISI plans to wipe out the august gathering that day. Some ISI agents befriend Bose, and he acts as an unwary courier carrying their RDX into the center. On Independence Day, all the scientists and the students are in place, and so is the massive bomb planted by ISI. The doors are locked by a colluding security man and the bomb activated. As time runs out, so do the options to save the trapped people. Finally, Bose's mother is forced to take a decision no mother would. And Bose makes a sacrifice no son would: to become an unparalleled hero.

Cast

 Sharwanand as Bose
 Shriya Reddy as Razia
 Suhasini as Saraswati, Bose's mother
 Pavan Malhotra as Bose's father
 Nagendra Babu as Terrorist 
 Suman as Major K. L. Chowdary, the Principal
 Gangadhar Pandey as Travel Agent
 Krishna Bhagavan as Sattiraju, the cook
 L. B. Sriram as Saloon Keeper Tirupathi
 Devadarshini as Saraswati's neighbor
 Tanikella Bharani as Paparao
 Narsing Yadav as Goon
 Sivannarayana Naripeddi as Police officer and friend of Bose
 Gundu Hanumantha Rao

Production

Pre-production 
Gangaraju's previous films Little Soldiers (1996), Aithe (2003) and Anukokunda Oka Roju (2005) could not garner much at the box-office. In an interview, he said that he "could not connect with larger section of audiences." However, he expressed optimism that the viewership has increased for his last two movies. While he produced the last two, his last directorial venture was Little Soldiers back in the nineties. This hiatus, according to him, was neither optional nor intentional but, it was either due to lack of funds or lack of offers to direct films. It was only after his friend who began a production house, Just Yellow Productions, he ventured into production.

For Amma Cheppindi, the short story Flowers for Algernon that Gangaraju read a long time ago, provided him with the necessary ideas. However, he said that the film's final screenplay is not similar to that story. The script for the film was written six years before filmmaking, even before his last two production ventures were conceptualized. Despite this, the script remained the same.

Casting 
Urmila Gunnam, the director's wife and producer for the film was responsible for selecting the cast for the film.

Gangaraju and Urmila noticed Sharwanand in Vennela (2005) and called him to discuss about this project. After a screen test, he was selected for the role of Bose. After Sharwanand was selected for the role, director Gangaraju said that he could not imagine any one else performing that role.

About Suhasini, who plays the mother of the protagonist, Gangaraju was initially hesitant about her being too young and slim to play a mother's role. However, he appreciated her performance and termed it as one of the most natural ones seen in recent times. Gangaraju said that Sriya Reddy's performance was one of the rarest performances by a Telugu actress in a while.

Music 
Amma Cheppindi songs were composed by M. M. Keeravani.

 "Vasthava Natho" - Shreya Ghoshal, Harish Raghavendra
 "EvremyinaAnnni vinaku" - Bombay Jayashri
 "The Largest Ciruclated" - Harish Raghavendhra, L.B. Sriram
 "Tirupathi Pechina Meesam" - Keeravani
 "Matlatho Swatale" - Pranavi
 "Amma Ga Korukuntunna" - Pranavi
 "Dot Dash" - Keeravani
 "Janaganamana" - Harish Raghavendra

Reviews 
Reviews were generally positive. One review said that Sharwanand "should feel lucky to get this role in the beginning of his career that has given him scope to come up with an award winning performance." Though the review wrote well about the music, dialogues, story and depiction of emotional scenes, the editing, screenplay and direction was hoped to have been better. Another review said that though the pace of the film was slow in the beginning, the performance by the cast and the technical departments was good.

References

External links 
 

2006 films
2000s Telugu-language films
Films scored by M. M. Keeravani
2006 drama films
Indian drama films